Poema de Amor is the second album by  Brazilian music superstar Elis Regina, It was released in 1962.

Track listing

 "Poema"   (Fernando Dias) 
 "Pororó-Popó"  (João Roberto Kelly)
 "Dá-me Um Beijo"  (Armando Trovajoli, Dannell, Romeu Nunes (versão))
 "Nos Teus Lábios"  ('Ataliba Santos & Haroldo Eiras)
 "Vou Comprar Um Coração"  (Paulo Tito, Romeu Nunes) 
 "Meu Pequeno Mundo De Ilusão" (Bob Hilliard, José Mauro Pires (versão), Lee Pockriss)
 "Las Secretárias"  (Martha Almeida (versão), Pepe Luis) 
 "Saudade É Recordar"  (Renan França, Verinha Falcão)
 "Pizzicati-Pizzicato" (Fred Jorge (versão), Marnay, Stern)
 "Canção De Enganar Despedida" (Joluz, Walter)
 "Confissão"  (Luiz Mergulhão, Paulo Aguiar, Umberto Silva)
 "Podes Voltar"  (Nazareno de Brito, Othon Russo)

References

1962 albums
Elis Regina albums
Continental Records albums
Portuguese-language albums